Vestiena is protected landscape in Ērgļi Municipality and Madona Municipality, approximately from Ērgļi Parish in the west to village  in the east. The territory was established to preserve and protect the Vidzeme Highlands landscape and natural diversity.
This is a Natura 2000 site.

Geography 
The Vestiena Protected Landscape Area includes the central part of the Vidzeme Highlands with the highest peak in Latvia - Gaiziņkalns - as well as other surrounding large hills, the height of which exceeds 270 meters above sea level (and others).

The territory includes Gaizinkalns Nature Park, nature reserves Lake Ilzina and Kala lake islands, nature monuments , as well as Vestiena manor alley.

Flora 
A large number of protected plant species can be found here: broomrape, hairy agrimony (Agrimonia pilosa), gladiolus (Gladiolus imbricatus), early marsh-orchid (Dactylorhiza incarnata).

Fauna 
Protect fauna species can be found here:
beetle (Graphoderus bilineatus), large white-faced darter (Leucorrhinia pectoralis), butterfly purple emperor (Apatura iris), land snail (Ena montana), spined loach (Cobitis taenia), European bullhead (Cottus gobio), brook lamprey (Lampetra planeri), lesser spotted eagle (Aquila pomarina), corn crake (Crex crex), European nightjar (Caprimulgus europaeus), woodlark (Lullula arborea), barred warbler (Sylvia nisoria), Eurasian otter (Lutra lutra), pond bat (Myotis dasycneme).

See also 
 List of protected areas of Latvia

References 

National parks of Latvia
Protected areas established in 1977
Geography of Latvia
Tourist attractions in Latvia
Natura 2000 in Latvia
Madona Municipality